Chal Gurab (also Romanized as Chāl Gūrāb) is a village in Sadat Rural District, in the Central District of Lali County, Khuzestan Province, Iran. At the 2006 census, its population was 31, in 5 families.

References 

Populated places in Lali County